Sumanben Chauhan is an Indian politician and a member of the Legislative Assembly of Gujarat in India. She represents the Kalol (state assembly constituency), which is in  Panchmahal district, Gujarat.

References

External links
 Elected in Kalol, Panchmahal

1960 births
Living people
Gujarat MLAs 2017–2022
Bharatiya Janata Party politicians from Gujarat
Place of birth missing (living people)